Forelia is a genus of arachnids belonging to the family Pionidae.

The genus was first described by Haller in 1882.

The species of this genus are found in Eurasia and Northern America.

Species:
 Forelia liliacea
 Forelia variegator

References

Trombidiformes
Acari genera